Thorncrest Village is a neighbourhood in northwestern Toronto, Canada. It is a collection of tree-lined streets north of Rathburn Road, between Kipling and Islington avenues, in what used to be part of Etobicoke.

Designed by architect and town planner Eugene Faludi, the village was considered one of Toronto's first modern suburbs. Village residents own three parkettes and a park with a clubhouse, tennis courts, a swimming pool and a playground.

References
Toronto Neighbourhoods Guide - Thorncrest Village

See also
List of neighbourhoods in Toronto

Thorncrest Village